The sport of association football in the country of Saint Vincent and the Grenadines is run by the Saint Vincent and the Grenadines Football Federation. The association administers the national football team, as well as the NLA Premier League. Cricket is the most popular sport in the country, followed by association football.

Football stadiums in St. Vincent and the Grenadines

References 

 
Sport in Saint Vincent and the Grenadines